is a Prefectural Natural Park in southwest Hokkaidō, Japan. Established in 1972, the park spans the municipalities of Setana, Shimamaki, and Suttsu.

See also
 National Parks of Japan

References

External links 
  Map of Natural Parks of Hokkaidō
  Map of Kariba-Motta Prefectural Natural Park

Parks and gardens in Hokkaido
Protected areas established in 1972
1972 establishments in Japan